Tiruvengimalai Sesha Sundara Rajan (1880–1953) was an Indian medical doctor, politician and freedom-fighter who served the Minister of Public Health and Religious Endowments in the Madras Presidency from 1937 to 1939.

Rajan was born in Srirangam in Trichinopoly district and studied medicine at Royapuram Medical School, Madras and England. He practised as a doctor in Burma and England and obtained his M.R.C.S. degree in 1911. In 1923, he set up his own clinic.

Rajan entered the Indian independence movement in 1919 and joined the Indian National Congress. He participated in the agitations against the Rowlatt Act and in the Vedaranyam Salt Satyagraha. He served as the President of the Tamil Nadu Congress Committee and as the Member of the Imperial Legislative Council of India from 1934 to 1936. From 1937 to 1939, he served as the Minister of Public Health in the Madras provincial government.

Early life 

Sundararajan was born in Nagapattinam 1880. He had his early education from St. Joseph's College, Trichinopoly and graduated in medicine from Royapuram Medical School, Madras. Following his graduation, Rajan moved to Burma and set up practice in Rangoon.

In 1907, Rajan sailed to England to pursue his higher studies. He obtained his M.R.C.S. degree in 1911 and worked in the Middlesex Hospital. He was an acclaimed surgeon and physician.

Rajan returned to Burma soon after and practised till 1914, before returning to India. In 1923, he set up his own clinic called "Rajan Clinic".

In the Indian independence movement 
During his days in England, Rajan was a close associate of V. D. Savarkar and V. V. S. Aiyar and was a member of the India House. However, in May 1910, Rajan had a quarrel with Aiyar. On his return to India in 1914, he met Rajagopalachari and joined the Indian National Congress. He participated in the agitations against the Rowlatt Act and was jailed for a year. He also coordinated and organised the activities of the Khilafat Committee from 1920 to 1922 along with T. V. Swaminatha Sastri.

Rajan served in a number of party posts in the Indian National Congress over the years. He served as the General Secretary of the Congress and as the President, and later, Secretary of the Tamil Nadu Congress Committee. He also served as the President of the Civil, Social and Welfare League of Trichinopoly.

Rajan participated in the Vedaranyam Salt Satyagraha organised by Rajaji and suffered imprisonment. He was released in 1931 after having been in prison for eighteen months. From 1932 to 1935, Rajan served as the President of the Tamil Nadu branch of the Harijan Sevak Sangh.

In 1934, Rajan was elected to the Imperial Legislative Council of India and served till 1936, when he resigned owing to differences of opinion. Rajan participated in the 1937 Madras provincial elections and was elected to the Madras Legislative Council. He took the portfolios of public health and religious endowments in the Rajaji cabinet.

Later years and death 

 In 1946, when the Congress was elected to power once again in Madras Presidency and Tanguturi Prakasam became Premier, Rajan was appointed Minister of Food and Public Health. 

In 1948, Dr. T. S. S. Rajan attended the Thiruvallur Taluk Agricultural Conference and unveiled the portrait of Sri. C. Rajagopalachari (Rajaji). He served as minister till 1951.

In 1953, Rajan had an operation for appendicitis. Shortly after the operation, he died on 14 December 1953 at the age of 73.

Works

Notes

External links 

Tamil-language writers
1880 births
1953 deaths
Burmese Hindus
Indian National Congress politicians from Tamil Nadu
Burmese people of Indian descent
Tamil Nadu ministers
Indian Vaishnavites
Members of the Imperial Legislative Council of India
Politicians from Tiruchirappalli
Indian independence activists from Tamil Nadu
Members of the Central Legislative Assembly of India
St Joseph's College, Tiruchirappalli alumni
Medical doctors in British India